Warabe may refer to:
 
 Warabe (group), a Japanese musical grup
 Warabe (album), an album of Kodo
 Warabe uta, a Japanese musical genre
 Faysal Ali Warabe,  Somali politician